UTC Transit Center is a San Diego Trolley station and transportation hub in the University City district of San Diego, California. It is located at University Towne Center (UTC), the outdoor shopping mall after which the station is named. The station's elevated trolley platform is served by the Blue Line, and stands above Genesee Avenue at its intersection with Esplanade Court. Its at-grade bus plaza is built into the lower level of one of the mall's parking structures that includes 333 spaces that can be used by transit customers who pay an hourly fee.

Bus service began at the transit center on October 27, 2017 and trolley service began 4 years later on November 21, 2021, as the new terminus of the Blue Line; it was constructed as part of the Mid-Coast Trolley extension project.

FlixBus boards from a different part of the mall, in front of the Pirch San Diego store.

Service

Station layout

References 

Blue Line (San Diego Trolley)
San Diego Trolley stations in San Diego
Railway stations in the United States opened in 2021